Aegidien Church (after Saint Giles to whom the church was dedicated) is a war memorial in Hanover, the capital of Lower Saxony, Germany. A church dating to 1347 when it replaced an older Romanesque church dating to 1163 which in turn replaced an even earlier chapel, Aegidien Church was destroyed during the night beginning 8October 1943 by aerial bombings of Hanover during World War II. In , Aegidien Church became a war memorial dedicated to victims of war and of violence.

History 
Originally completed in 1347 as a church dedicated to Saint Giles, one of the Fourteen Holy Helpers, it replaced a Romanesque church built in 1156–63 at the same site situated in the old town of Hanover, which replaced an early-Romanesque chapel thought to have been constructed around the turn of the first millennium.

In 1703–11,  designed the Baroque facade with which the steeple was decorated, and in 1826 Georg Ludwig Friedrich Laves used cast iron columns to remodel the interior of the church. Like the other two churches in the old town, Market Church and Church of the Holy Cross, Aegidien Church was destroyed along with most of the old town in 1943. The only two items in its interior that survived destruction are the brass baptismal font dating to 1490 that is now located in the Market Church, and three chandeliers that are now located in the Church of the Holy Cross. However, several Baroque epitaphs are featured on the outer walls. One of these shows Susanna Magdalena Oldekop, who died in 1648 as a child, with an angel. Also featured is a copy of the  a relief of seven praying men who, according to legend, died at the  defending the town in 1480; the original is now kept in the Hanover Historical Museum. 

In 1959  designed a monumental sculpture called Humility for the interior of Aegidien Church, which became part of the Market Church parish in 1982. 

Hiroshima, a twin town of Hanover since 1983, donated the peace bell close to the tower in 1985. It is used in an annual service on Hiroshima Day (6 August).

General references

References

External links 

 
 Stadthistorie.info

Buildings and structures completed in 1347
Aegidius
Destroyed churches in Germany
Ruins of churches destroyed during World War II
World War II memorials in Germany
Buildings and structures in Germany destroyed during World War II